McKenna Garcia (born January 6, 1995),  better known by her stage name McKenna Faith is a country music singer/songwriter from Ukiah, California.

Career
On August 21, 2011 Faith opened the Sonoma Country Music BBQ in Santa Rosa, California, playing with Dierks Bentley, Thompson Square and Luke Bryan. On February 14, 2012, McKenna Faith debuted her single "Head Over My Boots For You" to radio. Faith performed on the Blake Shelton and Friends Cruise in 2013.

On June 11, 2013 Faith released her first full length album, We Like Trucks. That September, Faith performed at the Sonoma Stampede Country Music Festival. She performed with Frankie Ballard and Tate Stevens.

Discography

Albums
We Like Trucks (2013)
Let's Get Lost (2014)

EPs
Seal It With A Kiss (2015)

References

External links 

People from Ukiah, California
People from Santa Rosa, California
American country singer-songwriters
American women country singers
1995 births
Living people
Singer-songwriters from California
21st-century American singers
21st-century American women singers
Country musicians from California